Chau Sar Mahalleh (also Romanized as Chā’ū Sar Maḩalleh) is a village in Pain Khiyaban-e Litkuh Rural District, in the Central District of Amol County, Mazandaran Province, Iran. At the 2006 census, its population was 67, in 14 families.

References 

Populated places in Amol County